Sonos may refer to:

Sonos, a music device manufacturer.
Sonos (vocal group), an electronic and vocal music group formed in 2009
SONOS, computer memory system
SóNós, second album by Paula Toller

See also
Sonus (disambiguation)